Marko Milivojevic (born 8 February 1988 in Belgrade, Yugoslavia) is a Serbian footballer goalkeeper.

Career

Serbia and Albania

In his native Serbia, Milivojevic played for a host of lower-league clubs- Policajac, FK Posavac, Fk Sopot, and FK PKB. Then, he plied his trade for Albanian clubs Skenderbeu and Luftetari for three years in total.

Vanuatu

Receiving a call from manager Lazar Mitic to play in Vanuatu in 2015, Milivojevic immediately accepted the offer, allured by the possibility of living in a tropical island. Once he got there, the goalkeeper was placed in a five-star resort and signed with Port Vila Premier League championship contenders Amicale F.C., mixing with three Serbians, three Italians, one Fijian, two Argentinians, and one Swiss. The contract was for three months, ending after the 2014-15 OFC Champions League. Targeting their first OFC Champions League title in 2015, Milivojevic was one of numerous foreign players signed for that reason but the club were unable to make it past the group stage, losing to Auckland City FC 3-0 after beating Suva and Western United. With Amicale, the Serbian reaped all domestic honors for the season, winning the domestic league, the domestic cup, and the 2015 Grand Casino Cup, surviving Cyclone Pam which devastated Vanuatu in March 2015 with few structures remaining extant.

References

Expatriate footballers in Vanuatu
Serbian footballers
Serbian expatriate footballers
Amicale F.C. players
Association football goalkeepers
Expatriate footballers in Albania
Red Star Belgrade footballers
1988 births
Footballers from Belgrade
Living people